Henry Arcado Biasatti (January 14, 1922 – April 20, 1996) was an Italian-Canadian National Basketball Association player and a Major League Baseball first baseman. He is the only Canadian to play at the top professional level in both sports.

Early career
Born in Beano, Italy, Biasatti grew up in Windsor, Ontario, where he was a star basketball player at Gordon McGregor Continuation School and Assumption College High School and played baseball for the East Windsor Cubs. He then played basketball at Windsor's Assumption College and served in the Canadian Army in World War II. Biasatti was a farmhand of the Toronto Maple Leafs baseball team, playing for the 1943 London Army Team and the 1944 and 1945 London Majors during the war.

The 1943 London Army Team won the Intercounty Baseball League (IBL) Championship, the Ontario Baseball Association Senior 'A' Championship and the Canadian Baseball Congress Championship. The next season, playing for the IBL Champion 1944 London Majors, Biasatti was ruled ineligible to play by the OBA because he would also play Sunday games in Detroit. The OBA ordered London to replay its semi-final series against Windsor because Biasatti had played for the Majors, a series London won again. In 1944, the London Majors also went on to win the Canadian Baseball Congress Championship.

Biasatti and the Majors also won the IBL and OBA senior title in 1945. Biasatti played basketball for Assumption between the 1945 and 1946 baseball seasons.

Professional career

Early baseball career
In 1946, Biasatti began the baseball season as the starting first baseman for the Leafs in the International League. He was a good fielder but a poor hitter, and lost the starting job. He was assigned to the Savannah Indians of the South Atlantic League at the end of May but returned to the Leafs a few weeks later. He asked to be farmed out in July and was sent to the Sunbury Yankees of the Class B Interstate League.

Basketball career
Following the 1946 baseball season, Biasatti was invited to the inaugural training camp of the Toronto Huskies in preparation for the first season of the Basketball Association of America, which evolved into the NBA. He was one of six Canadians invited to camp, and the only one who made the team. Former Assumption teammate Gino Sovran would join the Huskies a few weeks into the season, and the two were the only Canadians to ever play for the team. Biasatti played six games for the Huskies, including the BAA's first game on November 1, 1946. The NBA cites Biasatti as the first international player in league history. He was given an outright release by the Huskies in December after telling the team that baseball was his top priority and that he would be attending training camp for the Philadelphia Athletics. He was selected by the Boston Celtics in the 1947 BAA draft, but never played for the team.

Return to baseball
In baseball, Biasatti played in Savannah in 1947, hitting .299 and finishing second in the league in home runs. He rejoined the Leafs in 1948, on loan from the Athletics, and led the team with 21 home runs. Biasatti made it to the major leagues in 1949, appearing in 21 games for the Athletics. He got some playing time in August, after an injury to starting first baseman Ferris Fain, but over 24 at-bats that season, Biasatti's batting average was a very low .083. With eight walks, his on-base percentage was .312. He had just two hits in the major leagues, both of them doubles. After the season, he was purchased by the Buffalo Bisons of the International League and played there in 1950 and 1951.

Coaching and management career
In 1953, Biasatti was player-manager of the Waterloo Tigers of the Intercounty Baseball League, playing first base and pitching. He managed the Drummondville A's of Quebec's Provincial League in 1954 and the following season managed the Lancaster Red Roses in the Class B Piedmont League. Both of those teams were in the Philadelphia Athletics/Kansas City Athletics farm system.

Biasatti became head basketball coach at the newly renamed Assumption University in 1956, and in his first season, guided the team to the Ontario-Quebec Senior Intercollegiate Basketball League championship (shared with Queen's). Biasatti held the head coaching job for six seasons and again guided the team to the OQAA championship in the 1958–1959 season.

In 1996, Biasatti died at the age of 74 in Dearborn, Michigan. He was inducted into the Windsor/Essex County Sports Hall of Fame in 1982, the University of Windsor Alumni Sports Hall of Fame in 1986, and the Canadian Basketball Hall of Fame in 2001.

BAA career statistics

Regular season

References

External links

University of Windsor Alumni Sports Hall of Fame
FrozenHoops.com History of basketball in Canada. Selection of Top 100 Canadian players of all time

1922 births
1996 deaths
Baseball people from Ontario
Basketball people from Ontario
Boston Celtics draft picks
Buffalo Bisons (minor league) players
Canadian expatriate baseball players in the United States
Canadian men's basketball players
Canadian military personnel of World War II
Columbia Gems players
Guards (basketball)
Italian emigrants to Canada
Lancaster Red Roses players
Major League Baseball first basemen
Major League Baseball players from Canada
Major League Baseball players from Italy
National Basketball Association players from Canada
National Basketball Association players from Italy
Naturalized citizens of Canada
Philadelphia Athletics players
San Francisco Seals (baseball) players
Savannah Indians players
Sportspeople from Windsor, Ontario
Sunbury Yankees players
Toronto Huskies players
Toronto Maple Leafs (International League) players
Trois-Rivières Renards players
University of Windsor alumni